Penn is a 1954 Indian Tamil-language romantic comedy film written by Ra. Venkatachalam and directed by M. V. Raman. It stars Vyjayanthimala, Gemini Ganesan, S. Balachander and Anjali Devi while V. Nagayya, V. K. Ramasamy, K. N. Kamlam, K. R. Chellam and K. Sankarapani as the ensemble cast, was produce by A. V. Chettiar of AVM Productions. The score is composed by R. Sudharsanam with the lyrics by Papanasam Sivan and Udumalai Narayana Kavi, Ku. Sa. Krishnamurthy, K. P. Kamakshi and V. Seetharaman. Editing was done by K. Shankar and M. V. Raman while the camera was handled by T. Muthu Sami.

Plot 

The film's story revolves around two friends Rani and Kanmani.

Cast 

Male cast
 Gemini Ganesan as Raju
 S. Balachander as Raghu
 S. V. Sahasranamam
 K. Sarangapani
 V. Nagayya
 V. K. Ramasamy
 P. D. Sambandam

Female cast
 Vyjayanthimala as Rani
 Anjali Devi as Kanmani
 K. N. Kamalam
 K. R. Chellam
 Baby Rhadha

Production 
Penn was produced by A. V. Meiyappan, the founder of AVM Productions. It was simultaneously shot in Hindi as Ladki and in Telugu as Sangham. Vyjayanthimala appeared as the female lead in all three versions. Gemini Ganesan was cast after Meiyappan was impressed with his performance in Thai Ullam (1952).

Soundtrack 
The music was composed by R. Sudharsanam. Lyrics by Papanasam Sivan, Udumalai Narayana Kavi, Ku. Sa. Krishnamurthy, K. P. Kamakshi and V. Seetharaman. The song Kalyaanam Kalyaanam....... Ullaasamaagave Ulagaththil Vaazhave sung by J. P. Chandrababu for S. Balachander becomes an instant hit and was still played in many television. It was remixed by Sundar C. Babu for Thoonga Nagaram (2011).

Box office 
The film was a hit at box office.

References

External links 
 

1950s feminist films
1950s multilingual films
1950s Tamil-language films
1954 films
1954 musical comedy films
1954 romantic comedy films
AVM Productions films
Films about women in India
Films set in 1954
Films set in Chennai
Films set in Myanmar
Films set in Sri Lanka
Indian black-and-white films
Indian dance films
Indian multilingual films
Indian musical comedy films
Indian romantic comedy films
Tamil films remade in other languages
Films directed by M. V. Raman